Lee Airport  is a public use airport located in Anne Arundel County, Maryland, United States. The airport is five nautical miles (9 km) southwest of the central business district of Annapolis. It is privately owned by the Lee Airport Authority in Edgewater, Maryland.

Facilities and aircraft 
It has one asphalt paved runway designated 12/30 which measures 2,500 by 48 feet (762 x 15 m).

For the 12-month period ending March 20, 2015, the airport had 15,528 aircraft operations, an average of 43 per day: 97% general aviation and 3% military. At that time there were 80 aircraft based at this airport: 99% single-engine, 1% multi-engine and 0% helicopter.

References

External links 
 

Airports in Maryland
Transportation buildings and structures in Anne Arundel County, Maryland